Daniela Cristine Lionço (born 1 January 1989) is a Brazilian racing cyclist.

Major results
Source: 

2008
 8th Copa América de Ciclismo
2015
 1st  Time trial, National Road Championships
 1st  Omnium, National Track Championships
 1st Prova Ciclística 9 de Julho
2016
 1st  Individual pursuit, National Track Championships
 1st Prova Ciclística 9 de Julho
 1st Shimano Fest Brazil
 4th Time trial, National Road Championships
 Pan American Road Championships
9th Time trial
10th Road race
2019
 3rd  Madison, Pan American Track Championships (with Wellyda dos Santos)

See also
 List of 2015 UCI Women's Teams and riders

References

External links

1989 births
Living people
Brazilian female cyclists
Brazilian road racing cyclists
Brazilian track cyclists
People from Cascavel
Cyclists at the 2019 Pan American Games
Pan American Games competitors for Brazil
21st-century Brazilian women